Hillsdale is an active commuter railroad station in the borough of Hillsdale, Bergen County, New Jersey. Servicing trains on New Jersey Transit's Pascack Valley Line, the station is located at the intersection of Broadway (County Route 104) and Hillsdale Avenue (County Route 112). The next station to the north toward Spring Valley station is Woodcliff Lake and the next station to the south toward Hoboken Terminal is Westwood. The station contains one track while a single low-level side platform next to the station depot, resulting in no accessibility for handicapped persons under the Americans with Disabilities Act of 1990. 

The opening of the Hackensack and New York Extension Railroad from Anderson Street station in Hackensack to Hillsdale on March 4, 1870 resulted in the beginning of service. The station was one of two later operated by the Erie Railroad in Hillsdale, with the opening of the station at Hillsdale Manor in 1893.

History
The original station house, built 1870 as the terminus and headquarters of the New Jersey and New York Railroad, The head house has been on the state and federal registers of historic places since 1984 originally listed as part of the Operating Passenger Railroad Stations Thematic Resource. A large train yard once existed in the area of what is now Kings Super Markets.

Station layout
The station has one track and one low-level side platform.

Permit parking is operated by the Borough of Hillsdale. Four permit parking lots area available, with 170, 14, 15 and 69 spots, respectively. Permits may be obtained through the Borough of Hillsdale.

A dozen non-permit spaces are available for $5.00 per day, payable in a yellow collection box at the station.

See also 
 List of New Jersey Transit stations
 National Register of Historic Places listings in Bergen County, New Jersey

References

External links

Borough of Hillsdale
Station from Hillside Avenue from Google Maps Street View

NJ Transit Rail Operations stations
Railway stations in the United States opened in 1870
Railway stations in Bergen County, New Jersey
Second Empire architecture in New Jersey
Queen Anne architecture in New Jersey
Hillsdale, New Jersey
Former Erie Railroad stations
National Register of Historic Places in Bergen County, New Jersey
Railway stations on the National Register of Historic Places in New Jersey
1870 establishments in New Jersey
New Jersey Register of Historic Places